Russell J. Howard is an Australian-born executive, entrepreneur and scientist. He was a pioneer in the fields of molecular parasitology, especially malaria, and in leading the commercialisation of one of the most important methods used widely today in molecular biology today called “DNA shuffling" or "Molecular breeding", a form of "Directed evolution".

His contributions to malaria research over an 18-year period began in Australia at the Walter and Eliza Hall Institute of Medical Research, then continued as a tenured Principal Investigator at the National Institutes of Health (NIH) in Bethesda, MD, USA, and continued at the biotechnology companies DNAX (now Schering-Plough Biopharma) and Affymax in California. Thirteen years of his group's malaria research on antigenic variation in malaria  culminated in the first molecular cloning of the malarial antigen PfEMP1, a parasite protein that this human malaria parasite expresses on the surface of malaria-infected red cells This antigen represents critical biological functions for the parasite including immune evasion and adherence to microvascular endothelial cells. During this time Howard served on the World Health Organization's Special Program for Research and Training in Tropical Diseases and the USAID program for research and vaccine development in malaria.

While Howard was President and Scientific Director at Affymax Research Institute, Willem 'Pim' Stemmer conceived and developed DNA shuffling Technology. This revolutionary technology for improving the expressed phenotype of genes, pathways, plasmids, viruses and genomes gave birth to the creation and spinout of Maxygen Inc. where Howard was CEO for 12 years (1997-2009).

He took the company public in 1999 and led its growth with 10's of corporate partnerships and technology application programs that led ultimately to the development and commercialisation worldwide of 10's of Life Science products in diverse fields. Maxygen exploited DNA Shuffling technology across the entire Life Sciences spectrum, creating new companies dedicated to Agricultural Products (Verdia) and Industrial Chemical opportunities (Codexis) as well as a Protein Pharmaceuticals Business (Perseid).

In 2008, Howard left Maxygen to found Oakbio Inc. in 2009. He remains Chairman of Oakbio Inc. (doing business as NovoNutrients Inc.), in Sunnyvale, California, USA. NovoNutrients uses proprietary microbes for  capture from industrial processes. Industrial  emissions are used as sole carbon source and  gas as sole energy source to manufacture bacterial biomass, or single cell protein, a source of high quality protein for aquaculture and in future, for human foods .

Upon taking up residence in 2012 in Sydney, Australia, Howard became Executive Chairman of NeuClone Pty. Ltd., a clinical stage biotechnology company dedicated to development of biosimilars of monoclonal antibody drugs.

In 2013 Howard joined Prima Biomed Pty. Ltd., based in Sydney, Berlin and Paris, later renamed Immutep Pty. Ltd., as Non-Executive Director. In 2017 he took the role of Non-Executive Chairman and continues today in this role. Immutep develops novel immuno-oncology and autoimmune drugs based on its LAG3 patent estate.

He was Commercial Strategy Advisor at the Garvan Institute of Medical Research's Kinghorn Centre for Clinical Genomics in Sydney, 2015–2018.

Howard has published over 145 scientific publications in refereed journals and is an inventor on nine issued patents.

Education 
Howard graduated from Box Hill High School in Melbourne, Australia and later majored in Chemistry and Biochemistry at the University of Melbourne, culminating in a PhD in 1975 where he studied the carbohydrate and central metabolism of Caulerpa simpliciuscula, a marine green alga.

Employment 
He spent his first postdoctoral studies from 1976 to 1979 at the Immunoparasitology Laboratory at the Walter & Eliza Hall Institute in Melbourne, with frequent visits and collaborative work on sialic acids at the Biochemisches Institut at Christian Albrechts Universitat in Kiel, Germany. He started working as a Research Associate in the Malaria Section of the National Institutes of Health in Bethesda, Maryland before earning his tenure in the same institution in 1987. From 1988 to 1992, he worked at the Laboratory of Infectious Diseases of the DNAX Research Institute of Molecular and Cellular Biology in Palo Alto, California, USA, with dual roles, studying cytokine genes for Schering Plough, the parent organisation of DNAX Research Institute, and leading his Infectious Diseases laboratory there on malaria work funded by DNAX and USAID.
 
In 1994, he was named President and Scientific Director of Affymax, Inc. where he managed teams working on small molecule drug lead discovery using combinatorial chemistry and high throughput target screening. His independent malaria work continued at Affymax with support from USAID and Affymax, leading to cloning of the PfEMP1 gene while at Affymax. After Affymax was purchased by GlaxoWellcome, Howard led technology transfer and interchange in combinatorial chemistry, drug discovery and optimisation between Affymax and GlaxoWellcome worldwide. During this time, Molecular breeding or DNA shuffling Technology was conceived and the nascent company Maxygen Inc. incubated for later spun out from Affymax-GlaxoWellcome.
 
From 1997 to 2009, Howard worked as Maxygen's CEO, focusing on human, including, protein pharmaceutical drugs and vaccine discovery, as core business. Non-core businesses were successively incubated, nurtured and spun-out (Codexis) or sold (Verdia). In 2008, he left Maxygen with $200MM in cash, no debt, on-going clinical stage drug development programs and multiple partnerships and licenses with other parties.

Following his departure, Howard started Oakbio, Inc., doing business as NovoNutrients Inc, a privately held Clean Technology company in Sunnyvale, California, USA. NovoNutrients captures CO2 from industrial waste gas streams and uses microbial chemosynthetic systems to capture and convert this carbon resource to protein-rich microbial biomass and valuable chemicals, sequestering a Green House Gas from accumulation in the atmosphere.

In 2012 Howard moved residency from Silicon Valley, California, where he had worked for 25 years, to Sydney, Australia.

From Sydney, Howard acts as Executive Chairman of NeuClone, Non-Executive Chairman of Immutep and Chairman of NovoNutrients.

Financing leadership 
With Howard as CEO, Maxygen, Inc. completed its initial public offering of $110MM in 1999, just two years after its spinout from Affymax-GlaxoWellcome. In March 2000, Maxygen raised another $150MM in a Secondary Public Offering. More recently, Howard and colleagues at NeuClone, Pty. Ltd. raised >$10 MM (AUS) from private investors in Sydney to support development of a portfolio of 10 biosimilar monoclonal antibodies.

Recognition & research 
Howard has been awarded three Doctor of Science (honoris causa) degrees, one from the University of Technology, Sydney, Australia in 2004, one from the University of Queensland, Brisbane, Australia in 2008 and the third from the University of Melbourne, Melbourne, Australia in 2014.  He was awarded the inaugural Grimwade Medal for Biochemistry, Department of Biochemistry & Molecular Biology, University of Melbourne, in 2016.  Howard's >145 publications tackle topics ranging from the metabolism of the algae Caulerpa simpliciuscula, to the molecular pathogenesis of human cerebral malaria and the role of parasite antigenic variation and infected cell adherence in disease virulence. His papers reflect successful use of the tools of biochemistry, protein chemistry and structure-function, molecular biology, cell biology, large animal studies, and field studies with humans.

Patents 
Howard is an inventor on nine patents. At the NIH he patented discovery, characterisation and cloning of a novel gene encoding a soluble malarial antigen, called PfHRP2 that the most lethal human malaria releases into the blood. This discovery led to a rapid, sensitive, inexpensive and reliable diagnostic test for malaria infection that the NIH licensed commercially. This test has been used worldwide for over 15 years. In 1990 and 1995, he and his colleagues at Affymax applied for the patents of antigenic determinants obtained using a pathogenic agent or a derivative that presents a restricted set of antigens, and recombinant DNA clone from Plasmodium falciparum. While working at Maxygen Inc., he and his colleagues developed three patents for the following technologies: antigen library immunisation using polynucleotides encoding flavivirus and alphavirus; multivalent antigenic polypeptides; and optimisation of immunomodulatory properties of genetic vaccines

Selected references and publications

External links 
 Affymax Research Institute
 Maxygen, Inc.
 Oakbio, Inc.
 NeuClone Pty. Ltd.
 Prima Biomed Pty. Ltd
 Kinghorn Centre for Clinical Genomics, The Garvan Institute

Year of birth missing (living people)
Living people
Australian scientists
Australian businesspeople
Garvan Institute of Medical Research alumni
Malariologists
WEHI alumni